This is a list of notable Nigerian media personalities.

Ebuka Obi-Uchendu
Frank Edoho
Moet Abebe
Munachi Abii
Aisha Salaudeen
Gbenga Adeboye
Ifeoma Aggrey-Fynn
Taiwo Ajai-Lycett  
Kayode Akintemi
Anny Robert
Nenny B
Didi Akinyelure
Joseph Benjamin 
Andre Blaze
Monalisa Chinda
Stephanie Coker
CS Nwilliams
DO2dTUN
Kolade Dominate Olowu
Eku Edewor 
Yvonne Ekwere
Emmanuel "Mannie" Essien
Daddy Freeze
Murphy Ijemba
Linda Ikeji
IllRymz
Toke Makinwa
Tobechi Nneji
Chika Oduah
Femi Oke
Hamza Idris
Nedu Nwazobia
Kiki Mordi
Femi D Amele
Gbemi Olateru Olagbegi
Bolanle Olukanni
Jimitota Onoyume
Adaora Onyechere 
Ikponmwosa Osakioduwa
Otosirieze Obi-Young
Mozez Praiz
Yemi Shodimu
Wofai Samuel
DJ Spinall
Cleopatra Tawo
Toolz
Tope Tedela
Jude Thomas Dawam
Emma Ugolee
Genevieve Nnaji
Yinka Ayefele

Media